UEH may refer to: 

University of Economics, Ho Chi Minh City '''Trường Đại học Kinh tế Thành phố Hồ Chí Minh'''
University of Haiti (Université d'Etat d'Haïti)
Universidad Euro Hispanoamericana
the short name for University of Economics, Ho Chi Minh City